Thomas Pollard (1731 – 1799) was an 18th-century English shipbuilder, who worked at Deptford, Sheerness, Portsmouth, Woolwich, Plymouth and Chatham Royal Dockyards during the course of his career.He was responsible for the HMS Royal Sovereign which played a vital role in the Battle of Trafalgar.
Apprenticed  as a Shipwright to John  Rosewell of the notable Rosewell family at Deptford Dockyard in 1747 for a premium of £52. 10s 0d his father was recorded as being Robert Pollard.Apprentices were usually 16 years old at this time. National Archives ref(IR1 series)18f82 Britain county apprentices. It seems probable therefore that he was born during or before 1731

Life 
Thomas was possibly the second son of Robert and Mary Pollard who was Christened at St Clements Hastings on 4th August 1731(vital. England births and christenings)
Robert was possibly the shipwright who had contracted a lease from Hastings corporation for 15 years in 1727 (East Sussex record office HAS/E/A/B/14. and later in 1747 is recorded as a shipwright of Hastings buying oak trees to the value of £207.(East Sussex Record office SAS/PN637 counterpart bill of sale February 1747)
Thomas completed his apprenticeship with John Rosewell in Deptford around 1754. John Rosewell died the following year(Nat Burial Index Chatham 9th Nov. 1755)
On 20th August 1757 Thomas married Sarah Hargood in Chatham(English Parish Marriages)The Hargood family were connected to the Rosewells by marriage.
Thomas moved to Sheerness Dockyard by 1757 as here he took his first apprentices one in 1757 and another in 1763 (Britain county Apprentices 21f55 and 23f201) At this point in his career he was a Quarterman to the shipwrights and later a foreman.
He subsequently achieved promotion and in July 1765 moved  to Portsmouth as a "Master Boat Builder" a title usually requiring a minimum age of 20. He began work in [[Portsmouth]
In 1775 he moved to Woolwich Dockyard. In 1778 he moved to Plymouth Docks and in 1779 returned to Portsmouth. Not until 1782 did he obtain the title Master Shipwright, and at this point took overall control of the projects. His first role at this level was at Sheerness building HMS Mermaid. On completion of this project in 1784 he was moved to have overall control of the far larger Plymouth Dockyard and thereafter plied between Plymouth and the naval dockyard at Chatham Docks as the government required. From 1795 he was also required to oversee Deptford Dockyard.

He died at Deptford Dockyard in November 1799.

Main ships built 

 HMS Mermaid (1784) (Sheerness)
 HMS Medusa (1785) (Plymouth)
 HMS Royal Sovereign (1786) (Plymouth)
 HMS Serpent (1789) (Plymouth)
 HMS Chatham (1793) (Chatham)
 HMS Caesar (1793) (Plymouth)
 HMS Stag (1794) (Chatham)
 HMS Unicorn (1794) (Chatham)
 HMS Maidstone (1795) (Deptford)
 HMS Shannon (1795) (Deptford)
 HMS Stork (1796) (Deptford)
 HMS Diomede (1798) (Deptford)
 HMS Amethyst (1799) (Deptford)

Other works: refit of HMS Viper in 1786 at Plymouth

Surviving works 

A plan for a 41 foot punt/barge, signed "Thomas Pollard", capable of carrying a 30 ton load is held at the National Maritime Museum in  Greenwich.

References 
British Country apprentices N Archives (IR1 series ) 18f 82
 

1740s births
1799 deaths

Year of birth uncertain
People from Portsmouth
English shipbuilders
Vital English Births and Christenings 4th August 1731.

East Sussex  Record Office 
HAS/EA/B/14 Counterpart lease
28th January 1727.

East Sussex Record office SAS/PN637 Counterpart Bill of sale 17th February 1747.

National Burial index John Rosewell 9th November 1755.

English Parish Marriages 20th August 1757 Chatham.

English County Apprentices 
21f55 1757 23f201 1763  master Thomas Pollard Sheerness